Pope-Tribune (1904–1908) was part of the Pope automobile group of companies founded by Colonel Albert Pope manufacturing Brass Era automobiles in Hagerstown, Maryland.

History 
With an initial price of $650, the Pope-Tribune was the cheapest and smallest model of the Pope automobiles. The factory was set up in the old Crawford bicycle factory and run by Harold E. Pope, the colonel's son.

The first Pope-Tribune, a single-cylinder runabout, was introduced in 1904.  It was to the design of Gilbert J. Loomis, who made the Loomis automobile of Westfield, Massachusetts.  Model II also had a front-mounted, vertical, single-cylinder engine (with a 4.5in bore and a 4in stroke), wheel steering, sliding pinion gearbox, shaft drive and a bevel rear axle with a differential.

In 1905, the price of the car was reduced from $650 to $500, and a 12 hp two cylinder model was added.  Production continued until 1908, but by then the cars had become larger and more expensive.  The final models, with four-cylinder engines, were a 16/20 hp selling for $1,750 (and a 30 hp for $2,750.  The company closed in November 1908 and sold the Hagerstown factory.

The model that is on display in the National Motor Museum, Beaulieu, is an early model with a single cylinder and shaft drive.

See also
 About.com Classic Cars / 1904 Pope-Tribune 6hp
 Pope-Tribune Model II at ConceptCarz
 Bonhams / 1904 Pope-Tribune Model II 6hp Runabout

References

Veteran vehicles
Defunct motor vehicle manufacturers of the United States
Hagerstown, Maryland
Brass Era vehicles
1900s cars
Motor vehicle manufacturers based in Maryland
Vehicle manufacturing companies established in 1904
Vehicle manufacturing companies disestablished in 1908
Cars introduced in 1904